Pallini was a municipality in Chalkidiki, Greece. Since the 2011 local government reform it is part of the municipality Kassandra, of which it is a municipal unit. The municipal unit has an area of 128.183 km2. Population 6994 (2011). The seat of the municipality was in Chaniotis.

References

Populated places in Chalkidiki